Wittke is a German surname that has several origin, and it may refer to:
 Axel Wittke (born 1960), German football player
 Eva Wittke (born 1951), German Olympic swimmer; wife of Jochen Herbst, mother of Sabine Herbst
 Gudrun Baudisch-Wittke (1907–1982), an Austrian ceramist, sculptor and painter, a member of the Wiener Werkstätte
  (born 1961), a German Practical theologian
  (born 1964), German footballer
 Mackenzee Wittke (born 2008), Canadian girl with a lack of aging
 Manfred Wittke (born 1953), a German football player
 Oliver Wittke (born 1966), German politician
  (1957–2012), a German sociologist

Witke 
  (1862, Skrwilno  –  1944, Jasieniec), a Polish landowner, art collector, patron of artists and cultural institutions
 Ryszard Witke (born 1939, Sanok), a Polish ski jumper
  (born 1948), a German football referee

See also 
 Wojciech, Witkacy
 Veith
 Wittich, Wittig
 Witt (disambiguation), Witte
 Smědá River (Witka)

References

Low German surnames
German-language surnames